Giovanni or Gian Giacinto Sbaraglia (1687–1764), otherwise Joannes Hyacinthus Sbaralea, was a historian of the Franciscan Order.

Works include Supplementum et castigatio ad scriptores trium ordinum S. Francisi and Bullarium Franciscanum (in four volumes, Rome, 1759–1768).

Works 
 Bullarium Franciscanum Romanorum Pontificum constitutiones, epistolas, ac diplomata continens tribus ordinibus Minorum, Clarissarum, et Poenitentium a seraphico patriarcha Sancto Francisco institutis concessa ab illorum exordio ad nostra usque tempora iussu atque auspiciis reverendissimi patris magistri fr. Joannis Baptistae Constantii, 7 vols., Typis Sacrae Congregationis de Propaganda Fide, Romae 1759-1804.
 Supplementum et castigatio ad scriptores trium ordinum S. Francisci a Waddingo aliisve descriptos; cum adnotationibus ad Syllabum matyrum eorundem ordinum, 3 vols., Ex typographia S. Michaelis ad ripam apud Linum Contedini, Romae 1806.
 Germana s. Cypriani, et Aphrorum, nec non Firmiliani, et orientalium opinio de haereticorum baptismate, Ex Typographia Laelii a Vulpe, Bononiae 1741.
 Series ministrorum provincialium qui perantiquam Bononiae Provinciam Ordinis Minorum Conventualium inde ab initio administrarunt ex antiquis monumentis concinnata, Typis polyglottis vaticanis, Romae 1925.

Bibliography

External links
 

1687 births
1764 deaths
18th-century Italian historians